Cyclotrachelus sodalis is a species of woodland ground beetle in the family Carabidae. It is found in North America.

Subspecies
These three subspecies belong to the species Cyclotrachelus sodalis:
 Cyclotrachelus sodalis colossus (LeConte, 1846)
 Cyclotrachelus sodalis lodingi (Van Dyke, 1926)
 Cyclotrachelus sodalis sodalis (LeConte, 1846)

References

Further reading

 

Pterostichinae
Articles created by Qbugbot
Beetles described in 1846